The Book of Jarom is the fifth of the books that make up the Book of Mormon. According to the text it was written by Jarom, who was the son of Enos and a descendant of Jacob, the brother of the prophet Nephi.

The Book of Jarom is very short, consisting of only fifteen verses covering the years from 399 to 361 BC. Jarom was the son of Enos, and the grandson of Jacob, and the great-grandson of Lehi. He kept the commandment of his father to preserve the plates, and in turn he commanded his son Omni to preserve the plates. In the meantime, he inscribed these few verses on them.

Jarom declares that he would not write his prophesies and revelations because there is nothing he could add to the plan of salvation that his forefathers didn't already write first. Besides which, there was not enough room left on these plates to write very much. But Jarom recommends that his readers go to the other plates that have all the records of the wars between the Nephites and Lamanites.

Jarom says most of the Nephites have stiff necks (i.e., like a stubborn ox which will not turn), but God is merciful to them and he has not destroyed them yet. And there are even some Nephites who do not have stiff necks, and they have communion with the Holy Spirit. Despite having stiff necks, the Nephites have grown in population and keep the law of Moses. 

The Nephites withstood numerous assaults by the Lamanites, and fortified their cities against them. The essence of what Jarom wrote is that the Nephites did decide to obey the commandments of God and they did not get wiped off the face of the Earth as his father feared they would.

Blood drinking
Jarom says the Lamanites vastly outnumbered the Nephites, loved murder, and would even drink the blood of animals. The latter is a violation of Mosaic law, the shechita or ritual kosher slaughter, as referenced in Deuteronomy 12:22, where it states "Only be sure that thou eat not the blood: for the blood is the life; and thou mayest not eat the life with the flesh.", and a preceding verse which states "Notwithstanding thou mayest kill and eat flesh in all thy gates, whatsoever thy soul lusteth after, according to the blessing of the Lord thy God which he hath given thee: the unclean and the clean may eat thereof, as of the roebuck, and as of the hart. Only ye shall not eat the blood; ye shall pour it upon the earth as water." (Deut. 12:15-16). This may be taken as an indication that the Lamanites have strayed far from the Law of Moses.

Record Legacy
The record (a metal book written on sheets of gold) was passed through generations. Nephi, the writer of First and Second Nephi, forged the plates to write prophecies and spiritual teachings. Nephi passed them to his brother Jacob (Jacob 1:1-4), who passed them to his son Enos (Jacob 7:27), who passed them to his son Jarom (Jarom 1:1). (See Omni for more generations)

References

External links
 The Book of Jarom from The official website of The Church of Jesus Christ of Latter-day Saints

Jarom